Bullets Over Summer is a 1999 Hong Kong action film directed by Wilson Yip and starring Francis Ng and Louis Koo. For their performances in the film, Ng and Law Lan were awarded Best Actor and Best Actress respectively at the 6th Hong Kong Film Critics Society Awards while Law was also awarded Best Actress at the 19th Hong Kong Film Awards and Best Supporting Actress at the 5th Golden Bauhinia Awards.

Plot
Police officers Mike Lai (Francis Ng) and Brian Leung (Louis Koo) are partners and good friends. Mike is withdrawn and quiet while Brian is very cynical and is not appreciated by superiors. In order to arrest a group of robbers led by Dragon (Joe Lee), Mike and Brian set up a monitoring device in Granny's (Law Lan) apartment. At this time, Mike became acquainted with Jennifer (Stephanie Lam), a pregnant woman who was abandoned by her boyfriend. Mike, who grew up in an orphanage, expressed his willingness to be the father of Jennifer's child. On the other hand, Brian also meets a schoolgirl named Yen (Michelle Saram). Not long after, Mike discovers he was infected with a terminal illness and is running out of time. Mike makes a trading deal with Dragon where he obtains large sum of money for Jennifer to support herself and her child in the future. At the same time, he does not forget his responsibilities as a police officer and notifies Brian the whereabouts of Dragon. Together, Mike and Brian start a battle against Dragon to take him down.

Cast
Francis Ng as Mike Lai
Louis Koo as Brian Leung
Law Lan as Granny
Michelle Saram as Yen
Stephanie Lam as Jennifer Yuen
Wayne Lai as Stone
David Lee as Prince
Lo Mang as suspect under surveillance
Joe Lee as Dragon
Matt Chow as Granny's neighbor
Hau Woon-ling as Jennifer's customer
Wenders Li as convenient store robber
Tony Ho as robber with beret
Kenny Wong as robber
Roderick Lam as robber
Gary Mak as policeman
Ng Shui-ting as policeman
Ankee Leung	  	
Andy Tsang as food delivery boy in lift
Yuen Man-chun as security guard
Chow Pok-fu

Box office
The film grossed HK$2,193,045 in its theatrical run in Hong Kong from 5 August to 8 September 1999.

Awards and nominations

References

External links

Bullets Over Summer at Hong Kong Cinemagic

Bullets Over Summer film review at LoveHKFilm.com

1999 films
1990s action comedy-drama films
1990s crime comedy-drama films
Buddy comedy films
1990s buddy cop films
Buddy drama films
1990s Cantonese-language films
Films directed by Wilson Yip
Films set in Hong Kong
Films shot in Hong Kong
Hong Kong action comedy-drama films
Hong Kong buddy films
Hong Kong crime comedy-drama films
Police detective films
1999 comedy films
1999 drama films
1990s Hong Kong films